Two ships of the Royal Navy have borne the name HMS Convolvulus, after the flower:

  was an  sloop launched in 1917 and sold in 1922.
  was a  launched in 1940 and sold in 1947 for breaking up.

Royal Navy ship names